Low profile may refer to:

Music
 Low Profile, an American hip hop duo
 Low Profile (New Zealand band)

Space-saving technology

Computing
 Various computer and component form factors
 Low profile PCI cards
 Low-profile Quad Flat Package, a variation of the QFP integrated circuit package design

Other technologies
 Low profile ducting, in heating, ventilation, and air conditioning

Other uses
 The avoidance of drawing attention, often as a technique of espionage or to maintain privacy
 Low Profile Group, a clothing manufacturer supplying UK retail stores